Oliver Hart (born 13 September 1912 in Wigan, England  - died 1983) was an international speedway rider.

Career
Hart first rode with the Liverpool Chads in 1936. He finished scored a point in the Speedway World Championship final in 1949 riding at reserve. Hart was notable in speedway as being one of the last riders to only use the leg trailing method of riding. Hart made several international appearances for England between 1948 and 1951.

Family
His brother Ron Hart was also a speedway rider.

World final appearances
 1949 -  London, Wembley Stadium - 17th - 1pt

References

1912 births
1983 deaths
British speedway riders
English motorcycle racers
Speedway promoters
Belle Vue Aces riders
Bradford Tudors riders
Wimbledon Dons riders
Stoke Potters riders
Sportspeople from Wigan